The Boom Overture is a proposed , 65–88 passenger supersonic airliner with  of range, which is planned to be introduced in 2029 by Boom Technology. The company claims that with 500 viable routes, there could be a market for 1,000 supersonic airliners with business class fares. It had gathered 76 commitments by December 2017. The aircraft is planned to have a delta wing configuration (similar to the Concorde), but will be built with composite materials.  Following a redesign revealed in 2022 it is intended to be powered by four dry (non-afterburning)  turbofans. Regulations for takeoff noise or overland boom can be met or changed.

Market

The company says five hundred daily routes would be viable: at Mach 1.7 over water, New York/Newark and London would be 3 hours and 30 minutes apart; Newark and Frankfurt would be 4 hours apart. With  range, transpacific flights would require a refueling stop: San Francisco and Tokyo would be 6 hours apart. There could be a market for 1,000 supersonic airliners by 2035. Boom targets a $200 million price, not discounted and excluding options and interior, in 2016 dollars. The company claims that operational costs per premium available seat mile will be lower than subsonic wide-body aircraft. The Boom factory will be sized to assemble up to 100 aircraft per year for a 1,000- to 2,000-aircraft potential market over 10 years.

Boom targets $5,000 fares for a New York-to-London round-trip, while the same on Concorde cost $20,000 adjusted for inflation; it was its only profitable route. The same fuel burn enables fares similar to subsonic business class among other factors.
For long-range routes like San Francisco–Tokyo and Los Angeles–Sydney, 30 lie-flat first-class seats could be proposed alongside 15 business-class seats.

In March 2016, Richard Branson confirmed that Virgin Group holds options for 10 aircraft, and Virgin Galactic's subsidiary The Spaceship Company will aid in manufacturing and testing the jet. An unnamed European carrier also holds options for 15 aircraft; the two deals total 5 billion dollars. At the 2017 Paris Air Show, 51 commitments were added for a backlog of 76 with significant deposits. In December 2017, Japan Airlines was confirmed to have pre-ordered up to 20 jets among the commitments to 76 from five airlines. Boom CEO Blake Scholl thinks 2,000 supersonic jets will connect 500 cities and promises £2,000 for London to New York one-way, comparable with existing subsonic business class.

On June 3, 2021, United Airlines announced they had signed an agreement to purchase 15 Overture aircraft with an additional 35 options, expecting to start passenger flights by 2029. On August 16, 2022, American Airlines announced an agreement to purchase 20 Overture aircraft with an additional 40 options.

Order summary

Development
By March 2016, the company had created concept drawings and wooden mockups of parts of the aircraft.

The plane could seat 55 passengers in a higher-density configuration.

Boom initially targeted a Mach 2.2 cruise speed to fit with transoceanic airline timetables and allow higher utilization, while keeping airport noise to Stage 4, similar to subsonic long-range aircraft. The plane configuration was intended to be locked in late 2019 to early 2020 for a launch with engine selection, supply chain, production site. Development and certification of the airliner and its engine were estimated at $6 billion, requiring Series C investors. Enough money was raised in the B round of fundraising to be able to hit key milestones, including flying the demonstrator (XB-1) to prove the technology, building up an order backlog,  finding key suppliers for engines, aerostructures, and avionics, and lay out the certification process, with many special conditions but with precedents.

At the June 2019 Paris Air Show, Boom CEO Blake Scholl announced the introduction of the Overture was delayed from 2023 to the 2025–2027 timeframe, following a two-year test campaign with six aircraft. In September 2020, the company announced that they have been contracted by the United States Air Force to develop the Overture for possible use as Air Force One.

On October 7, 2020, Boom publicly unveiled its XB-1 demonstrator, which it planned to fly for the first time in 2021 from Mojave Air and Space Port, California. It expected to begin wind tunnel tests for the Overture in 2021, and start construction of a manufacturing facility in 2022, with the capacity to produce 5 to 10 aircraft monthly. The first Overture would be unveiled in 2025, with the aim of achieving type certification by 2029. Flights should be available in 2030, as estimated by Blake Scholl.

Boom currently targets a slower Mach 1.7 cruise. In January 2022, Boom announced a grant of US$60m from the US Air Force’s AFWERX program to further develop the Boom Overture supersonic airliner.  In July 2022, Boom announced a partnership with Northrop Grumman to develop a 'special mission' variant for the U.S. Government and its allies. As of January 2022, the Overture's first flight is planned for 2026 with introduction into service expected in 2029.

On July 19, 2022, Boom unveiled a revised proposal for the production version of the Overture at the Farnborough Airshow. This version has four engines and a tailed delta wing.

On December 13, 2022, Boom announced that it would develop its own turbofan engine after "Big Three" engine manufacturers Rolls-Royce, Pratt & Whitney and General Electric, as well as CFM and Safran previously declined to develop a new engine due to high capital costs. Named Symphony, (see § Engines below) the engine will be developed under partnership with three entities: Kratos subsidiary Florida Turbine Technologies for engine design; StandardAero for maintenance; and General Electric subsidiary GE Additive for consulting on printing components.

Design

Overture's wing configuration is a conventional compound delta for low supersonic drag, designed to be like a 75% scale model of Concorde. It features no low sonic boom unlike the SAI Quiet Supersonic Transport (QSST), or laminar supersonic flow technology from the Aerion AS2. Due to the low 1.5 wing aspect ratio, low-speed drag is high, and the aircraft requires high thrust at take-off. Boom also needs to address the nose-up attitude on landing. Airframe maintenance costs are expected to be similar to those of other carbon fiber airliners. The Overture should operate at a quarter of the costs of Concorde by relying on dry (no afterburner) engines, composite structures, and improved technology since Concorde's development. In 2021, Boom presents a longer length of 205 ft (62 m) with a capacity of 65 to 88. Changes to maximum take-off weight or required engine thrust are not disclosed.

The FAA and ICAO are working on a sonic boom standard to allow supersonic flights overland. NASA plans to fly its Low Boom Flight Demonstrator for the first time in 2022 to assess public acceptability of a 75  boom, lower than Concorde's 105 PNLdB. The Overture is expected to not be louder at takeoff than current airliners like the Boeing 777-300ER. Supersonic jets could be exempted from the FAA takeoff noise regulations, reducing their fuel consumption by 20–30% by using narrower engines optimized for acceleration over limiting noise. In 2017, Honeywell and NASA tested predictive software and cockpit displays showing the sonic booms en route, to minimize its disruption overland.

Design changes announced in July 2022 included an increase in the number of engines to four to allow for smaller less technically challenging engines and to allow takeoff at derated levels to lower noise, and redesigned gull form wing and fuselage to reduce drag.

Engines 

The Boom Symphony is a two-spool medium-bypass turbofan engine under development for use on Overture. The engine is designed to produce  35,000 pounds (160 kN) of thrust at takeoff and sustain Overture supercruise at Mach 1.7, and burn sustainable aviation fuel exclusively.

Development of the engine will be conducted in partnership with Kratos subsidiary Florida Turbine Technologies for engine design, General Electric subsidiary GE Additive for additive manufacturing consulting, and StandardAero for maintenance. Boom aims for initial production of the engine to begin in 2024 at the Overture factory at Greensboro, North Carolina.

Specifications

See also

References

External links
 

Supersonic transports
Proposed aircraft of the United States
Quadjets